Kolmas Nainen (literally The Third Woman in Finnish) is a successful Finnish rock band established in 1982 in Alavus was fronted by Pauli Hanhiniemi and came to fame after taking part in the 1984 Rockin SM-kisat, a rock music competition. The band survived for a decade releasing 7 studio albums in addition to a number of live albums, DVDs and compilations. The band is enjoying a comeback since 2009 with a string of new studio and compilation releases. 

Members 
The original band was made up of:
Pauli Hanhiniemi – vocals, keyboards, harmonica, accordion
Pasi Kallioniemi – drums, backing vocals
Raimo Valkama – bass
Sakari Pesola – guitar and backing vocals
Timo Löyvä – guitar (1982–1989)

After guitarist Timo Löyvä left in 1989, he was replaced by:
Timo Kivikangas – guitar (1989–1994)

2009 comeback
The band broke up in 1994, but continued performing on brief occasions owing to its popularity. In 2009, it made a big comeback with the release of the album Sydänääniä that topped the Finnish Albums Chart and the follow up Me ollaan ne that reached number 2 in the same chart.

Discography
Kolmas Nainen
Studio albums
1986: Kolmas Nainen
1987: Paha minut iski
1989: Hikiset siivut
1990: Hyvää ja kaunista
1991: Elämän tarkoitus
1992: Tiheän sisään 
1994: Onnen oikotiellä
Live albums
1992: Ajatuskatkoja (EP)
2000: Rattle & Snake

DVDs
2004: Lauteilla (DVD+CD)

Compilations
1988: Poikavuodet
1993: Kultahippuja
1996: Master series
1998: Ura – 38 maamerkkiä matkan varrelta (peaked FINLAND: #2)

Singles
1984: "Olen sekaisin / Mennä vai no? / Etsikää Asseri" (Rock Club – live)
1985: "Vanhat äijät / Etsikää Asseri"
1986: "Sähkökitara, hyvää tahtoa ja kavereita / Mies vain hymyilee"
1986: "Krokotiilikuppila / Asserin kapakkaan"
1987: "Maanantai / Raatona maantiellä"
1988: "Sylistäsi heräsin / Aikamiespoika"
1988: "Onneksi voin unohtaa / Vuoret tuuli pois puhaltaa"
1989: "Äiti pojastaan pappia toivoi / Hikiset siivut"
1989: "Lentojätkä ja tyttökulta / Jos se ois helppoo"
1989: "Päivät kuluu hukkaan / Valehtelisin jos väittäisin" 
1990: "Tästä asti aikaa / Bussiraiskan surumarssi"
1990: "Hyvää ja kaunista / Talot ja tienhaarat"
1991: "Lautalla / Helsinki"
1991: "Elämän tarkoitus / Ote talon kirjasta"
1992: "Niin sen täytyi olla / Tango taisteluni / Lentojätkä ja tyttökulta" (live)
1992: "Paskanhajua / Uneni on vasta alussa"
1993: "Onpa kadulla mittaa! / Iloisen merimiehen laulu / Onpa kadulla mittaa (soulversio)"
1993: "Onneksi voin unohtaa (live) / Kovalla kädellä (live) / Vuoret tuuli pois puhaltaa (remix)"
1994: "Ooh, Sammy! / Oi Suomen nuoria / Ooh, Sammy! (rock version)"
1994: "Kai mä tästäkin toivun / Jerusalemin suutari (viuluversio)"
1995: "En oo kuullu mitään / Pyörteeseen"
1998: "Elämän tarkoitus (jousiversio 98) / Maailma on tyly (Provinssi 97 live)"
1999: "Sekunnit ja tunnit"

Kolmas Nainen (Comeback period) (2009–)AlbumsCompilation albumsSingles'
2009: "Kaiken pitäis muuttuu"
2009: "Mitä tapahtuu"
2009: "Pilviin"
2009: "Pois tilanteesta" (Radio edit)
2013: "Me ollaan ne"

References

Finnish rock music groups